Independence Power Plant is a 1,678-megawatt coal-fired base load power plant near Newark, Arkansas. The plant has two units, rated at 850 MWe each, that came online in 1983 and 1984. The plant is owned in part by Entergy Arkansas. It has a 305-meter chimney built in 1983.

Emissions
In 2013, Environment America ranked the plant 35th on its list of the 100 dirtiest coal-fired power stations in the U.S., reporting that its 2011 emissions were equivalent to 2.3 million passenger vehicles.

The plant released 10,787,400 metric tons of greenhouse gases in 2012 according to the EPA. The emissions in metric tons comprised:
Carbon dioxide: 10,705,646
Methane: 25,974
Nitrous oxide: 55,780

Phase-out plan 
In 2018, the owner Entergy announced a plan to close the plant by 2030.

See also

 List of power stations in Arkansas
 Global warming

References

External links
 tower diagram 
 Data on generation and fuel consumption from the Energy Information Administration Electricity Data Browser

Energy infrastructure completed in 1983
Towers completed in 1983
Energy infrastructure completed in 1984
Coal-fired power stations in Arkansas
Buildings and structures in Independence County, Arkansas
Towers in Arkansas
Chimneys in the United States
Entergy